The NCAA held its first men's National Collegiate Soccer Championship in 1959, with eight teams selected for the tournament.  Before 1959, national champions were selected by a committee of the Intercollegiate Soccer Football Association (ISFA) based on season records and competition. In addition, the College Soccer Bowl tournament was held from 1950–1952 (following the 1949–1951 seasons) for the purpose of deciding a national champion on the field. The Soccer Bowl was a one-site competition involving four teams selected by college soccer administrators. However, the ISFA committee continued to select the national champion in those three years (in 1950 selecting as champion a team that did not participate in the second Soccer Bowl).

History
College soccer started in Northeast colleges and at private schools in the late 19th century, while club soccer was mostly played in the Midwest and the South.  In the West, Stanford started up a soccer program in 1911, University of San Francisco in 1932, and UCLA in 1937, playing largely amateur teams.  In 1945, at the end of the world war, the ISFA had only 22 member college teams.  This grew to over 50 by 1947.

From 1905 through 1925, the Intercollegiate Soccer Football League (an Ivy League forerunner) determined an annual champion in College soccer. The league was dissolved after the 1925 season when Harvard and Yale threatened to resign citing dissatisfaction with the organization and scheduling saying its took players away from their educational studies too frequently. The former league pledged to create a new representative soccer association that could help govern the sport at a collegiate level. Soon after the Intercollegiate Soccer Football Association was born offering an annual Outstanding Soccer Team award, the mythical national soccer championship, through 1935 and from 1946 through 1958.

Member Schools

ISFL / ISFA College Soccer National Champions
College champions were determined by various methods over the years as listed below.  They are all considered unofficial.
1905–1925:  Champion of the Intercollegiate Soccer Football League
1926–1935:  Determined by the Intercollegiate Soccer Football Association
1936–1940:  No selection by ISFA. Listed are outstanding teams that claim a share of the championship.
1941–1945:  No selection by ISFA. Intercollegiate soccer was severely curtailed by world war.
1946–1958:  Determined by the Intercollegiate Soccer Football Association
1949–1951:  Seasons for which Soccer Bowl was played (two of these were played early the following year)

 (a) Soccer Bowl: Penn State tied San Francisco 2-2.
 (b) Soccer Bowl: Penn State defeated Purdue 3-1.
 (c) Soccer Bowl: Temple defeated San Francisco 2-0
 Sources:

ISFL / ISFA Team Championship Records

See also
 NCAA Division I Men's Soccer Tournament
 Soccer Bowl (1950–52)

References

External links
NCAA Men's Soccer Hickoksports
College Champions, 1904-1958
The Year in American Soccer 
American College Soccer, 1946-1959: The Postwar era

 
Soccer governing bodies in the United States
College soccer competitions in the United States
Sports organizations established in 1926